Justicia camerunensis is a species of plant in the family Acanthaceae. It is found in Cameroon and Nigeria. Its natural habitat is subtropical or tropical moist lowland forests. It is threatened by habitat loss.

References

camerunensis
Vulnerable plants
Taxonomy articles created by Polbot
Plants described in 1962